Tetratheca affinis is a species of plant in the quandong family that is endemic to Australia.

Description
The species grows as an erect, open and leafless shrub to 10–70 cm (occasionally up to a metre) in height. The pink-purple flowers appear from August to November.

Distribution and habitat
The species occurs within the Avon Wheatbelt, Esperance Plains, Jarrah Forest, Mallee and Warren IBRA bioregions of south-west Western Australia. The plants grow on slopes, flats and swamp edges with sandy and lateritic soils.

References

affinis
Eudicots of Western Australia
Oxalidales of Australia
Taxa named by Stephan Endlicher
Plants described in 1837